Malaya Cup was a tournament held annually by a Malaya Cup committee. This is the 37th season of Malaya Cup (later known as Malaysia Cup). It were contested by states in Malaysia. The final were contested by the southern and northern champions in their respective conference round. Six states sent their teams. The final were held at Merdeka Stadium, Kuala Lumpur on 29 September 1963 where Selangor winning Malaya Cup, by defeating Penang with scoreline 6–2.

Conference Round
15 teams participated the Malaya Cup, Malacca, Negeri Sembilan, Singapore, Penang, Selangor and Perak. The teams were divided into two conference, the Northern Section and Southern Section. The Northern Section comprises Penang, Selangor and Perak while Southern Section represented by Johor, Negeri Sembilan, Malacca and Singapore. Each team will play with each other (two games per team) and the winners of each conference will play in the final. Each win will give the team 2 points while losing will give 0 points. A draw means a point were shared between two teams.

Northern Section

Southern Section

Semi-final

Penang FA  won 3−2 on aggregate. 

Selangor FA  won 9−4 on aggregate.

Final
The final were held at Merdeka Stadium, Kuala Lumpur on 29 September 1963. Selangor won the cup by defeating Penang with scoreline 6–2.

Winners

References

External links
1963 Malaya Cup Results by Rec.Sport.Soccer Statistics Foundation(RSSSF)

1925 in Malayan football
Malaysia Cup seasons